The 2015–16 Ohio Bobcats men's basketball team represented Ohio University during the 2015–16 NCAA Division I men's basketball season. The Bobcats, led by second year head coach Saul Phillips, played its home games at the Convocation Center in Athens, Ohio as a member of the East Division of the Mid-American Conference.  They finished the season 23–12, 11–7 in MAC play to finish in second place in the East Division. They defeated Northern Illinois in the quarterfinals of the MAC tournament to advance to the semifinals where they lost to Buffalo. They were invited to the College Basketball Invitational where they defeated Albany and UNC Greensboro to advance to the semifinals where they lost to Morehead State.

Previous season

The Bobcats finished the 2014–15 season 10–20, 5–13 in MAC play to finish in last place in the East Division. They lost in the first round of the MAC tournament to Western Michigan.

Departures

Recruits

Recruiting class of 2016

Roster

Preseason
The preseason poll and league awards were announced by the league office on October 28, 2015. Ohio was picked to finish third in the MAC East.

Preseason men's basketball poll
(First place votes in parenthesis)

East Division
 Akron 132 (17)
 Kent State 116 (5)
 Ohio 69
 Buffalo 64 (1)
 Miami 60
 Bowling Green 42

West Division
 Central Michigan 138 (23)
 Toledo 110
 Western Michigan 94
 Eastern Michigan 71
 Northern Illinois  37
 Ball State 33

Tournament champs
Central Michigan (15), Akron (6), Buffalo (1), Kent State (1)

Preseason All-MAC 

Source

Schedule
Source: 

|-
!colspan=9 style=|Exhibition

|-
!colspan=9 style=|Non-conference regular season

|-
!colspan=9 style=| MAC regular season

|-
!colspan=9 style=| MAC Tournament

|-
!colspan=9 style=| CBI

Statistics

Team Statistics
Final 2015–16 Statistics

Source

Player statistics

Source

Awards and honors

All-MAC Awards 

Source

See also
2015–16 Ohio Bobcats women's basketball team

References

 Ohio Bobcats men's basketball schedule

Ohio
Ohio Bobcats men's basketball seasons
Ohio Bobcats men's basketball
Ohio Bobcats men's basketball
Ohio